Hildegard Joos (7 May 1909 in Sieghartskirchen, Lower Austria – 17 January 2005 in Vienna) was an Austrian painter and is known as the "Grande Dame" of geometric abstraction and constructivism in Austria.

Life 
Hildegard Joos spent her childhood in Lower Austria. After the Second World War, she studied at the Academy of Fine Arts in Vienna.

In 1955, she became a member of the Vienna Secession and, in 1958, was the first female artist whose work was presented in a solo exhibition in the main room of the Vienna Secession. Three other individual exhibitions took place there in 1964, 1967 and 1980. From 1959 onwards, together with her husband Harold Joos, Hildegard Joos had a studio in Paris. There she achieved great recognition with her monistic paintings. She participated in the international development of geometric abstraction and in numerous exhibitions such as the "Salon des Indépendants" and the "Salon des Réalités Nouvelles". She was coined by the Paris Salon of Réalités Nouvelles since she became a member there in 1972.

Joos was referred to as the "Grande Dame" of abstract painting in Austria. Checkerboard and raster images were an important part of her artistic work. Her first works, on the other hand, were figurative, colorful and expressive.

Initially, the artist couple signed their collaborations with "Hildegard Joos", and from 1980 with "H + H Joos".

Hildegard Joos died in Vienna in 2005, aged 95 years old.

In 2014, Viennese gallerist and art dealer Martin Suppan organized a retrospective of Hildegard Joos in the Vienna Künstlerhaus with more than 140 works on display.

Solo exhibitions (selection) 
1958                   First Solo Exhibition in the Vienna Secession
1960                   Wiener Konzerthaus
1961                   Junge Generation Wien
1962                   Hildegard Joos, Main room of the Vienna Secession
1964                   Hildegard Joos, Main room of the Vienna Secession
1965                   Galerie Jeunes, Paris
1966                   Hildegard  Joos Oeuvres récentes. Peintures-Gouaches, Amsterdam, Prinzengracht, Anne Frank Stichting
1967                   Hildegard Joos, Oil Paintings, Gallery of the Vienna Secession
1968                   Palazzo Artelli, Triest
1969                   Brücke, Bielefeld
1971                   C. R. D. P Orleans, Frankreich
1972                   Galerie Stubenbastei Vienna
1975                   Galerie Grohmann Munich
1978                   Galerie Modern Art Vienna
1980                   Hildegard Joos, Painting and Graphic 1959–1979, Main room of the Vienna Secession 
1984                   Hildegard & Harold Joos, MUMOK Museum Vienna
1984                   Monochrome Bilder der 60er Jahre, Schloss Buchberg am Kamp, NÖ
1989                   Hildegard & Harold Joos, Narrative Geometrismen, Museum moderner Kunst Linz
1994                   H + H Joos, Narrative Geometrismen, Raumnarrative Bilder und Colour Field 1990–1993, NÖ Landesmuseum
1996                   H + H Joos, Serie  Rot-Blau, Internationales Kulturzentrum Egon Schiele, Krumau
1997                   H + H Joos, Von den Anfängen bis heute, Österreichische Galerie Belvedere
2005                   „In Memorian Hildegard Joos“ Österreichische Galerie Belvedere
2014                   Hildegard Joos Retrospektive im Künstlerhaus Wien, Suppan Fine Arts
2015                   H+H Joos, abstrakt • konstruktiv • narrativ, ɑrbeiten auf papier 1952 and 2000, Suppan Fine Arts
2017                   H+H Joos, works on paper, Suppan Fine Arts

Public collections (selection) 
Galerie Belvedere, Wien
Niederösterreichisches Landesmuseum, St. Pölten
MUMOK, Wien
Albertina Museum, Wien
Lentos Museum, Linz
Museum Liaunig, Neuhaus
Artothek des Bundes, Wien
NÖ Landesmuseum, St.Pölten

Awards 
 1987: Preis der Stadt Wien für Bildende Kunst

External links 
 
 
 
 Hildegard Joos Retrospektive at the Künstlerhaus Vienna
 H+H Joos. Monoɡraph to the Retrospective. Viennaː Edition Suppan Fine Arts, 2014,  (Online)

1909 births
2005 deaths
20th-century Austrian women artists
Austrian painters
Austrian women painters
Constructivism (art)
Artists from Vienna